Carlos Negron (born 7 September 1964) is a Puerto Rican wrestler. He competed in the men's freestyle 52 kg at the 1988 Summer Olympics.

References

1964 births
Living people
Puerto Rican male sport wrestlers
Olympic wrestlers of Puerto Rico
Wrestlers at the 1988 Summer Olympics
Place of birth missing (living people)